François-Étienne-Christophe Kellermann or de Kellermann, 1st Duke of Valmy (28 May 1735 – 23 September 1820) was a French military commander, later the Général d'Armée, a Marshal of the Empire and freemason. Marshal Kellermann served in varying roles throughout the entirety of two epochal conflicts, the French Revolutionary Wars and the Napoleonic Wars. Kellermann is one of the names inscribed under the Arc de Triomphe, on Column 3.

Early life
François Christophe de Kellermann came from a Saxon family, which was long settled in Strasbourg and ennobled. He was the only son of a family living in the French province of Alsace. His father was François de Kellermann (or Johann Christoph Edler von Kellermann) and his mother, Baroness Marie Magdalene von Dyhrn.

Military career prior to the Revolution
The fifteen-year-old François Kellermann entered the French Army as a cadet volunteer with a hussar regiment: the Régiment de Loweridath. He was commissioned as an ensign in the Royal-Bavière infantry regiment and promoted to captain in 1758 in the course of the Seven Years' War. On one occasion he distinguished himself by capturing 300 prisoners while leading a small cavalry detachment. In 1771, Kellermann saw active service in Poland, becoming a chevalier of the Order of Saint-Louis. A further promotion to capitaine-commandant followed in 1776 before he became major in the Hussars of Conflans (Hussards de Conflans) three years later. Kellermann became brigadier-general in 1784, and in the following year marechal-de-camp. While a number of Napoleon's marshals served in the Royal army prior to the Revolution, Kellermann was the only one to have reached such senior rank under the former regime.

Revolutionary career
In 1789 Kellermann enthusiastically embraced the cause of the French Revolution, and in 1791 became general of the army in Alsace. In April 1792 he was made a lieutenant-general, and in August of the same year there came to him the opportunity of his lifetime. He rose to the occasion, and his victory over the Prussians at the Battle of Valmy, in Goethe's words, "opened a new era in the history of the world". Napoleon later commented that: "I think I'm the boldest general that ever lived, but I daren't take post on that ridge with windmill at Valmy (where Kellermann took position) in 1793".

Transferred to the army on the Moselle, Kellermann was accused by General Adam Custine of neglecting to support his operations on the Rhine; but he was acquitted at the bar of the National Convention in Paris, and placed at the head of the army of the Alps and of Italy, in which position he showed himself a careful commander and excellent administrator.

Shortly afterwards he received instructions to reduce Lyons, then in revolt against the convention, but shortly after the surrender he was imprisoned in Paris for thirteen months. Once more honourably acquitted, he was reinstated in his command, and did good service in maintaining the south-eastern border against the Austrians until his army was merged into that of General Napoleon Bonaparte in Italy.

Imperial career
Kellermann was then sixty-two years of age, still physically equal to his work, but the young generals who had come to the front in the previous two years represented the new spirit and the new art of war, and Kellermann's active career came to an end. But the hero of Valmy was never forgotten. When Napoleon came to power Kellermann was named successively senator (1800), president of the Senate (1801), honorary Marshal of France (19 May 1804), and title of Duke of Valmy (1808).

In his service to the First French Empire, Kellermann was frequently employed in the administration and training of the army. He also took control of the line of communications and the command of reserve troops, and his long and wide experience made him one of Napoleon's most valuable assistants.

In 1814 he voted for the deposition of the emperor and became a peer under the royal government of Louis XVIII. After the "Hundred Days" he sat in the Chamber of Peers and voted with the Liberals.

Marshal Kellermann died in Paris on 23 September 1820, and is buried in Père Lachaise Cemetery.

His son François Étienne de Kellermann, 2nd Duke of Valmy, also fought for Napoleon and was promoted to cavalry general after the Battle of Marengo. Kellermann's grandson was the politician François Christophe Edmond de Kellermann.

Notes

Sources

External links 

 
 

1735 births
1820 deaths
Military personnel from Strasbourg
French people of German descent
Military leaders of the French Revolutionary Wars
Dukes of Valmy
Marshals of the First French Empire
French military personnel of the Seven Years' War
French Republican military leaders of the French Revolutionary Wars
Burials at Père Lachaise Cemetery
Peers of France
French Freemasons
Names inscribed under the Arc de Triomphe